Leohumicola incrustata is a species of fungi. It was named after the appearance of its terminal conidial cells, incrusted with a crust-like slime. It was first found in the Cape of Good Hope Nature Reserve, from heated soil. Large warts or the production of slime on its terminal cell are this species' defining characteristics. Its conidia are similar to those of L. verrucosa, however in the latter the wall ornamentation forms smaller warts.

Description
Its conidiogenous hyphae are hyaline, measuring approximately 1.5–2.0μm wide, often found in fascicles in aerial mycelium. These are reduced to a single denticle that is 1.0–3.0μm long and 1.5–3.5μm wide. Conidia are two-celled, either solitary or distributed side by side in clusters. Its terminal cell is 4.0–5.5 by 4.0–5.0μm, being globose to subglobose, transitioning to a pale brown to dark brown colour; its conidial walls are slightly thick, smooth or verrucose, with warts measuring 0.75 to 1.5μm, incrusted with a brown-coloured slime that is 1–2μm thick around the apex. Its basal cell measures 2.5–4.5 by 2.0–3.0μm. Chlamydospores are sparsely produced, being intercalary, single, and the same colour as the conidial terminal cell. The vegetative mycelium often carry swollen, monilioid hyphae that are 1.5 to 3μm wide, septate, and show thickened walls.

References

Further reading

External links

Leotiomycetes
Fungal plant pathogens and diseases